Abigail McCary (born 1982) is an American model and beauty pageant titleholder who was appointed as Miss World United States 2007.

References

Miss World 2007 delegates
1982 births
Living people
American beauty pageant winners
People from Minneapolis